Benchalak is a district (amphoe) of Sisaket province, northeastern Thailand.

History
The minor district (king amphoe) was created on 31 May 1993, when five tambons were split off from Kantharalak district. It was upgraded to a full district on 5 December 1996.

Geography
Neighboring districts are (from the south clockwise): Kantharalak, Si Rattana, Nam Kliang, and Non Khun of Sisaket Province; Det Udom and Thung Si Udom of Ubon Ratchathani province.

Administration
The district is divided into five sub-districts (tambons), which are further subdivided into 64 villages (mubans). There are no municipal (thesaban) areas. There are five tambon administrative organizations (TAO).

References

External links
amphoe.com

Benchalak